9th CFCA Awards
March 10, 1997

Best Film: 
 Fargo 
The 9th Chicago Film Critics Association Awards, given on 10 March 1997, honored the finest achievements in 1996 filmmaking.

Winners
Best Actor:
Billy Bob Thornton - Sling Blade
Best Actress:
Frances McDormand - Fargo
Best Cinematography:
The English Patient
Best Director:
Joel Coen - Fargo
Best Film:
Fargo
Best Foreign Language Film:
Dekalog (The Decalogue), Poland
Best Score:
"Fargo" - Carter Burwell
Best Screenplay:
Fargo - Joel Coen and Ethan Coen
Best Supporting Actor:
Cuba Gooding Jr. - Jerry Maguire
Best Supporting Actress:
Irma Hall - A Family Thing
Most Promising Actor:
Edward Norton - Primal Fear, Everyone Says I Love You and The People vs. Larry Flynt
Most Promising Actress:
Courtney Love - The People vs. Larry Flynt

References

 1996
1996 film awards